Marko Mamić (born 6 March 1994) is a Croatian handball player for SC DHfK Leipzig and the Croatian national team.

References

External links

Marko Mamić, nada hrvatske rukometne budućnosti 

Living people
1994 births
Croatian male handball players
Handball players from Zagreb
Expatriate handball players in Poland
Croatian expatriate sportspeople in France
Croatian expatriate sportspeople in Poland
Croatian expatriate sportspeople in Switzerland
Olympic handball players of Croatia
Handball players at the 2016 Summer Olympics
Vive Kielce players
Handball-Bundesliga players
21st-century Croatian people